John van Melle (11 February 1887 – 8 November 1953) was the pen name of a Dutch-born South African writer. His real name was Johannes van Melle.

Van Melle was born in Goes. He arrived in South Africa in 1906, and after a short sojourn in the Netherlands East Indies, settled in South Africa permanently in  1913. He worked as a teacher in many rural schools and soon started to publish in both Dutch and the newly emerging Afrikaans language.

Van Melle's best known work is the novel Bart Nel, a classic of Afrikaans literature. It tells the tale of a farmer whose indomitable spirit allows him to survive the destruction and loss of his farm in wartime and being abandoned by his wife and family.

1887 births
1953 deaths
Dutch emigrants to South Africa
Melle, John Van
South African educators
South African male novelists
20th-century South African novelists
20th-century South African male writers